Obed Wheeler (November 15, 1841 – January 31, 1898) was an American businessman and politician from New York who served as a member of the New York State Assembly.

Early life 
Wheeler was born on November 15, 1841. in Dover, New York. In 1858, he went to the Amenia Seminary in Amenia. In 1860, he began attending Yale University, but he left in order to fight in the American Civil War. His parents were Thomas Wheeler and Rhoda Ann Olney.

Career 
In September 1862, Wheeler enrolled in the 150th New York Volunteer Infantry Regiment, where he was mustered in as first lieutenant in Company E. In December 1863, he was promoted to captain of his company. He was also made brevet major. He was mustered out with his company in June 1865. His regiment's first battle was the Battle of Gettysburg, and he fought in a number of other battles, including Sherman's March to the Sea.

After the War, Wheeler studied at Columbia Law School and, upon his graduation, was admitted to the bar. However, he never practiced law, as he then became a member of the New York Stock Exchange. He later served as director of the Brooklyn Warehouse and Storage Company, the Schermerhorn Bank of Brooklyn, and the Plaza Bank of Manhattan.

In 1877, Wheeler was elected to the New York State Assembly as a Republican, representing the Dutchess County 1st District. He served in the Assembly in 1878, 1879, and 1892.

Personal life 
For many years, he lived in the Murray Hill Hotel in Manhattan. However, his permanent residence was the family mansion in South Dover, and he owned two large farms in Dover Plains. Wheeler never married. He was a member of the Union League Club, the New York Yacht Club, the Military Order of the Loyal Legion of the United States, and the Grand Army of the Republic. He was also a freemason and a member of the New York Athletic Club. He was a supporter of the Dover Baptist Church.

Wheeler died on January 31, 1898, in his New York City apartment from a pulmonary hemorrhage. He was buried in Woodlawn Cemetery.

References

External links 

 The Political Graveyard

1841 births
1898 deaths
Columbia Law School alumni
New York Stock Exchange people
People from Dover, New York
Republican Party members of the New York State Assembly
Union Army officers
People of New York (state) in the American Civil War
New York (state) lawyers
Businesspeople from Brooklyn
Members of the New York Yacht Club
American Freemasons
Baptists from New York (state)
Deaths from pulmonary hemorrhage
Burials at Woodlawn Cemetery (Bronx, New York)
19th-century American politicians
19th-century American lawyers
19th-century Baptists
19th-century American businesspeople